Michael Yani was the defender of title, but he was eliminated by Carsten Ball in the semifinal.
Ryler DeHeart defeated Ball in the final 6–2, 3–6, 7–5.

Seeds

Draw

Final four

Top half

Bottom half

References
 Main Draw
 Qualifying Draw

Sunset Moulding YCRC Challenger - Singles